James Tobin (1918–2002) was an American economist.

James Tobin may also refer to:

James Tobin (presenter) (born 1980), Australian television presenter
Jim Tobin (activist) (1945-2021), American economist and educator
Jim Tobin (1912–1969), Major League Baseball pitcher
Jimmy Tobin (1898–1978), Irish hurler
James Tobin (planter) (1736/7–1817), English merchant, plantation owner in Nevis, and controversialist defending slavery
James Webbe Tobin (1767–1814), English abolitionist, son of the planter
James William Tobin (1808–1881), merchant and politician in Newfoundland
James Tobin (political operative), President George W. Bush's New England campaign chairman
James Tobin (author) (born 1956), American journalism professor and author